Baillie Gifford Shin Nippon is a publicly traded investment trust which invests in Japanese smaller companies. The Trust is managed by Baillie Gifford & Co Limited, the Edinburgh-based investment management partnership. It is listed on the London Stock Exchange.

History
Baillie Gifford Shin Nippon PLC was launched in July 1985, in order to capitalise on the investment opportunity available among companies too small and illiquid for Baillie Gifford Japan Trust PLC, which had been launched successfully four years before. Shin Nippon, which means New Japan, has as its objective the pursuit of long term capital growth principally through investment in small Japanese companies which are believed to have above average prospects for capital growth. It became part of the FTSE 250 Index in November 2020.

References

External links
Baillie Gifford Shin Nippon Website 
Baillie Gifford & Co Website
Trust Magazine - Investment trust news, expert analysis, videos, competitions, and more from Baillie Gifford

Investment trusts of the United Kingdom
Financial services companies established in 1985
Companies listed on the London Stock Exchange
Investment management companies of the United Kingdom
Companies based in Edinburgh
1985 establishments in Scotland